Saint Petersburg State Institute of Technology (Technical University) was founded in 1828. It is one of the oldest institutions of higher education in Russia, and it currently trains around 5,000 students.

History
In the past, the institute was named Imperial Petersburg Institute of Technology ( and Lensoviet Leningrad Institute of Technology, the institute's name changing with that of the city.

During the Imperial period, unlike most other Russian universities, the institute did not require completion of gymnasium education as a condition of entry; the only requirement was to pass the institute's examination. Thus, it had one of the most democratic student communities at the time.

Staff
Staff include:
28 Academicians and Corresponding Members of the Russian Academy of Sciences.
125 Professors and Doctors of Science
560 Assistant Professors and PhDs

Degree subjects

The institute provides degrees in the following subjects:
New materials for modern branches of science and technology in the fields of rocket and space techniques;
Information science;
Study of materials and functional materials;
Medicine and public health;
Maintenance of the vital activity of human and ecology;
Reconstructive materials;
Varnishes and paints;
Adhesives;
Biological materials
Medicinal materials
Superconductive materials;
Optoelectronics and nanomaterials;
Software engineering;
Devices for control of chemical processes;
Machines and apparatuses for chemical-technological system.
Advertising and public relations

Notable faculty

Dmitri Mendeleev
Axel Gadolin
Viktor Kyrpychov
Konstantin Petrzhak
Friedrich Konrad Beilstein
Dmitri Konovalov
Boris Rosing
Mikhail Shultz
Shuliachenko Aleksey Romanovich (Russian: Шуляченко, Алексей Романович)
Golovin Kharlampiy Sergeevich (Russian: Головин, Харлампий Сергеевич)

Notable alumni
Pyotr Nikolaevich Lebedev
Alexander Lodygin
Abram Fedorovich Ioffe
Boris Galerkin
Yuri Artsutanov
Alexander Nesis
Sergey Prokudin-Gorsky
Mark Gelfand (Medical Device Inventor)
Valentin Nikolayev, Olympic figure skating coach, once coached Oksana Baiul

References

External links
Official English Page of the Institute
Satellite photo of the territory

 
Universities in Saint Petersburg
Engineering universities and colleges in Russia
Educational institutions established in 1828
1828 establishments in the Russian Empire
Cultural heritage monuments of federal significance in Saint Petersburg